The Justanids or Jostanids were an Iranian Zaydi Shia dynasty that ruled a part of Daylam (the mountainous district of Gilan) from 791 to the late 11th century.

History 
The Justanids appear as kings of Daylam at the end of the 8th century.  Their centre was in the Rudbar of Alamut, running into the valley of the Shahrood.  Two centuries later, this had become the main centre of the historical Nizari Ismailis or Assassins (Hashshashin), as they are known in the west.  They appear in Islamic history as part of what Vladimir Minorsky has called "the Iranian Intermezzo". This refers to a period in which indigenous Daylamite and Kurdish principalities took power in northwest Persia after two to three centuries of Arab rule. The Daylamite upsurge eventually culminated in the Buyid dynasty.

After Marzuban ibn Justan converted to Islam in 805, the ancient family of Justans became connected to the Zaydi Alids of the Daylam region.  The Justanids adopted the Zaydi form of Shi'ism.  In the 10th century, they were eclipsed by the Daylamite dynasty of Sallarids in Tarom (modern Iranian province of Zanjan).  Nevertheless, the Justanids were tied by marriage with the Sallarids and preserved their seat of Rudbar in the highlands of Daylam.  They also became allies with the Buyids.  In the 11th century, they may have recognized the suzerainty of the Ghaznavids.  Later, they recognized the suzerainty of the Seljuqs, but, shortly after, they fade from history.

Justanid rulers 
 Justan I (791–805)
 Marzuban of Daylam (805–855)
 Justan II (855–856)
 Vahsudan of Daylam (856–865)
 Khurshid of Daylam (865)
 Justan III (865-919)
 Ali of Daylam (919)
 Khusrau Firuz (919)
 Siyahchashm (919–928)
 Justan IV (928–947)
 Manadhar (947–972)
 Khusrau Shah (972–1004)

Family tree

References

Sources 
 
 

Clifford Edmund Bosworth, The New Islamic Dynasties: A Chronological and Genealogical Manual, Columbia University, 1996.
Minorsky, Vladimir, Studies in Caucasian History. New York: Taylor's Foreign Press, 1953.
 

 
History of Gilan
History of Zanjan Province
History of Qazvin Province
8th century in Asia
9th century in Asia
10th century in Asia
791 establishments
Iranian dynasties
History of Talysh